Eeva Haimi (born 15 December 1945) is a Finnish sprinter. She competed in the women's 400 metres at the 1968 Summer Olympics.

References

External links
 

1945 births
Living people
Athletes (track and field) at the 1968 Summer Olympics
Finnish female sprinters
Finnish female middle-distance runners
Olympic athletes of Finland
Place of birth missing (living people)
Olympic female sprinters